This is a list of Belgian painters.  Where available, it includes the painter's place and year of birth; the place and year of death; and painting style.

For painters from this region before 1830, see List of Flemish painters.

A

Edouard Agneessens (1842–1885)
Pierre Alechinsky (born in Brussels, 1927) Contemporary
Harold Ancart
Carla Arocha (born in Caracas, Venezuela)
Alphonse Asselbergs (born in Brussels) (1839–1916)

B

Albert Baertsoen (1866–1922) Impressionism
Firmin Baes (born in Saint-Josse-ten-Noode, 1874 died in Uccle, 1943)Impressionism
Rachel Baes (born in Ixelles, 1912 died in Bruges, 1983)Surrealism
Piet Bekaert (1939–2000) Impressionism
Anna Boch (1848–1936) Neo-impressionism
Eugène Boch (1855–1941) Impressionism
Gaston Bogaert (1918–2008) Surrealism
Michaël Borremans (born in Geraardsbergen, 1963)
Hippolyte Boulenger (1837–1874) Realism
Virginie Bovie (1821–1888) eclectic painter with Flemish Baroque, Romantic, and Realist influences
Ignace Brice (born in Brussels, 1795died in Brussels, 1866), Neoclassicism
Jean Brusselmans (born in Brussels, 1884 died in Dilbeek, 1953) Fauvism
Louis Buisseret (born in Binche, 1888 died in Brussels, 1956)
André Buzin (born 1946) paints animals and flowers

C

Nestor Cambier (born in Couillet, 1879 died in Brussels, 1957) portraiture, landscapes, city views, still lifes, murals, drawings
Jean-Baptiste Capronnier (born in Brussels, 1814 died in Brussels, 1891) stained-glass painter
Jacques Carabain (born in Amsterdam, 1834 died in Schaerbeek, 1933) Cityscape painter
Marcel Caron (born in Enghien, 1890 died in Liège, 1961) Expressionism
Évariste Carpentier (born in Kuurne, 1845 died in Liège, 1922)Naturalism, Impressionism
Anto Carte (born in Mons, 1886 died in Ixelles, 1954) Symbolism, Expressionism
François Cautaerts (born in Brussels, 1810 – died in Brussels, 1881), historical and religious themed paintings
Cécile Cauterman (born in Ghent, 1882 died in Ghent, 1957), drawings
Caroline Chariot-Dayez (born in Brussels, 1958) Hyperrealism
Emile Claus (born in Sint-Eloois-Vijve, 1849 died in Astene, 1924) Impressionism
Paul Jean Clays (born in Bruges, 1819 died in Brussels, 1900) Marine painting
Jan Cockx (born in Antwerp, 1891 died in Antwerp, 1976) painter and ceramicist
Jean Baptiste Leopold Colin (1881–1961), portraits, nudes, and still lifes
Omer Coppens (born in Dunkirk, 1864 died in Ixelles, 1926) Impressionist painter, ceramic artist
Léon Corthals (born in Temse, 1877 died in Ixelles, 1935) portraiture
Franz Courtens (born in Dendermonde 1854 died in Saint-Josse-ten-Noode 1943), Pleinairisme, landscape and marine painting
Jan Cox (born in The Hague, 1919 died in Antwerp, 1980) Avant-garde, Abstract art, Figurative
Luc-peter Crombé (born in Opwijk, 1920 died 2005)

D

Paul Daxhelet (born in Liège, 1905 died in Liège, 1993) Orientalism
Hugo Debaere (born in Ghent, 1958 died in Ghent, 1994) Avant-garde
Fritz de Brouckère (born in Brussels, 1879 died in Brussels, 1928), Impressionism, Symbolism
Jan De Cock (born in Brussels, 1976) Contemporary
Jos De Cock (born in Kortrijk, 1934 died in Paris, 2010)
Henry de Groux (born in Brussels, 1866 died in Saint-Josse-ten-Noode, 1930) Symbolism
Carole Dekeijser Contemporary
Raoul De Keyser (born in Deinze, 1930–2012) Abstract
Hippolyte de la Charlerie (1827–1869) painter and illustrator
Basile De Loose (born in Zele, 1809 died in Brussels, 1885) portrait and genre painter
Paul Delvaux (born in Antheit (Wanze) 1897 died in Veurne, 1994) Surrealism
Jean Delville (1867–1953) Symbolism
André de Meulemeester (1894–1973) Flemish-Belgian painter 1917 
Jos de Mey (1928–2007) Flemish-Belgian painter, primarily of impossible objects in a photo-realistic style
Albert Demuyser born in Laeken (1920–2003)
William Degouve de Nuncques (born in Monthermé, 1867 died 1935) Symbolism
Gustave De Smet (born in Ghent, 1877 died in Deurle (Sint-Martens-Latem), 1943) Expressionism
Albrecht De Vriendt (Ghent, 8 December 1843 – Antwerp, 14 October 1900), Belgian painter known for his genre scenes, history paintings, interiors and figure paintings
The de Vriendt brothers (Juliaen Joseph (1842–1935) and Albrecht François Lieven (1843–1900))
Louis Dewis (born in Mons, 1872 died in Biarritz 1946) Post-Impressionism
August De Wilde (born in Lokeren, 1819 died in Sint-Niklaas 1886) portrait and genre painter
Sam Dillemans (born in Leuven 1965) Contemporary
Christian Dotremont (born in Tervuren, 1922 died in Buizingen, 1979) Avant-garde
Arpaïs Du Bois (born in Ghent 1973) Contemporary

E

James Ensor (born in Ostend, 1860 died in Ostend, 1949) painter and printmaker
Henri Evenepoel (born in Nice, 1872 died in Paris, 1899) fauvism

F

Émile Fabry (born in Verviers, 1865 died in Woluwe-Saint-Pierre, 1966) Symbolism
Jean-Michel Folon (born in Uccle 1934 died in Monaco 2005)
Théodore Fourmois (1814–1871)  landscape painter and printmaker
Alice Frey (born in Antwerp, 1895 died in Ostend, 1981) Expressionism

G

Louis Gallait (born in Tournai, 1810 died in Schaerbeek, 1887)
Jane Graverol (born in Ixelles, 1905 died in Fontainebleau, 1984)Surrealism

H

Philip Henderickx (born 1976) Contemporary
Hugo Heyrman (born in Antwerp, 1942) Contemporary

J

Floris Jespers (1889–1965) Avant-garde

K

Fernand Khnopff (born in Grembergen, 1858 died in Brussels, 1921) Symbolism

L

Paul Lauters (1806–1875)  Abstraction, Tachisme, Ecole de Paris
Georges Emile Lebacq (born in Jemappes, 1876 died in Bruges, 1950) Impressionism, Post-Impressionism
Charles Leickert (born in Brussels, 1816 died in Mainz, 1907) Winter scenes
Georges Lemmen (1865–1916) Neo-Impressionism
Auguste Levêque (born in Nivelles, 1866 died in Saint-Josse-ten-Noode, 1921) painter influenced both by Realism and Symbolism
Jan August Hendrik Leys (born in Antwerp, 1815 died in Antwerp, 1869) Romance

M

Jean Baptiste Madou (born in Brussels, 1796 died in Saint-Josse-ten-Noode, 1877) painter and lithographer
René Magritte (born in Lessines, 1898 died in Brussels, 1967) Surrealism
Auguste Mambour (born in Liège, 1896 died in Liège, 1968) Expressionism, Cubism, African art
Frans Masereel (born in Blankenberge, 1889 died in Avignon, France, 1972) painter and woodcutter
Armand Massonet (1892–1979)
Constantin Meunier (born Etterbeek, 1831 died in Brussels, 1905) painter and sculptor
Henri Michaux (1899–1984) painter, poet and writer
Constant Montald (born in Ghent, 1862 died in Brussels, 1944) painter

N

François-Joseph Navez (born in Charleroi, 1787 died in Brussels, 1869) Neo-classicism
Xavier Noiret-Thomé (born in 1971) Contemporary

O

Jacques Ochs (born in Nice, 1883 died in Liège, 1971) Illustrator, Caricaturist
Christian Otte (born in Theux, 1943 died in Liège, 2005)

P

Pierre Paulus (born in Châtelet, 1881 died in Brussels, 1959) Expressionism
Constant Permeke (born in Antwerp, 1886 died in Ostend, 1952) Expressionism
Erik Pevernagie (born 1939) Contemporary
Louis Pevernagie (1904–1970) Expressionism
Jean-François Portaels (born in Vilvoorde, 1818 died in Schaerbeek, 1895)

R

Armand Rassenfosse (born in Liège, 1862 died in Liège, 1934) Symbolism, Art nouveau
Reniere&Depla (born in Poperinge, 1956 and born in Ostend, 1954)
Roger Raveel (Machelen-aan-de-Leie, 1921–2013) painter especially of pop art
Gaston Relens (1909-2011)
Félicien Rops (born in Namur, 1833 died in Essonne, France, 1898) artist, and printmaker in etching and aquatint

S

Anthoni Schoonjans (1655–1726)
Pierre Schwarz (born in Brussels, 1950) Neo-expressionism
Albert Servaes (1883–1966) Expressionism
Victor Servranckx (born in Diegem, 1897 Elewijt, 1965) Cubism
Leon Spilliaert (born in Ostend, 1881 died in Ostend, 1946) Symbolism, Expressionism
Alfred Stevens (born in Brussels, 1828 died in Paris, France, 1906)
Alexander Struys (born in Berchem, 1852 died in Uccle, 1941)

T

Jan Theuninck (born in Zonnebeke, 1954) Contemporary painter and poet
Albert Thys (born in Kontich, 1894 died in 1976) portraiture, landscapes
Luc Tuymans (born in Mortsel, 1958) Contemporary
Edgard Tytgat (born in Brussels, 1879 died in Woluwe-Saint-Lambert, 1957) Fauvism

U

Raoul Ubac (born in Malmedy or Cologne, 1910 died in Dieudonné, Oise, 1985)

V

Hilaire Vanbiervliet (born in Courtray, 1890 died 1981) Expressionism
Jef Van Campen (born in Antwerp, 1934) Expressionism
Frans Van Damme (born in Hamme, 1858 died in Brussels, 1925) – Impressionism, Realism
Hans Vandekerckhove (born in Kortrijk, 1957) Contemporary
Philippe Vandenberg (born in Ghent, 1952 died in Brussels, 2009)
Frits Van den Berghe (born in Ghent, 1883 died in Ghent, 1939) Expressionism
Louis Van den Eynde (born in Anderlecht, 1881 died in 1966) portrait and genre painter
Jef Van der Veken (born in Antwerp, 1872 died in Ixelles, 1964) copyist and art restorer
Henry van de Velde (born in Antwerp, 1863 died in Zurich, Switzerland, 1957) Art Nouveau
Gustave Van de Woestijne (born in Ghent, 1891 died in Brussels, 1947)
Albert Van Dyck (born in Turnhout, 1902 died in Antwerp, 1951) portrait and genre painter
Peter Van Gheluwe (born in Ghent, 1957) Contemporary
Anne-Mie Van Kerckhoven (born in Antwerp, 1951) Contemporary
Cornelius Van Leemputten (1841–1902) painter especially of landscapes with sheep
Louis Van Lint (born in Brussels, 1909 died in Brussels, 1986) Abstract expressionism
Koen Vanmechelen (born in Sint-Truiden, 1965) Contemporary
Eugeen Van Mieghem (born in Antwerp, 1875 died in Antwerp, 1930) Impressionism
Jan Vanriet (born in Antwerp, 1958) Contemporary
Théo van Rysselberghe (born in Ghent, 1862 died in Saint-Clair, Var, France, 1926) Pointillism
Eugène Joseph Verboeckhoven (1790–1881) animal painter
Jan Verdoodt Magic realism; follower of Magritte
Fernand Verhaegen (born in Marchienne-au-Pont (Charleroi), 1883 died in Montigny-le-Tilleul, 1975) painter and etcher
Frans Verhas (born in Dendermonde, 1827 died in Schaerbeek, 1897) portrait and genre painter
Jan Verhas (born in Dendermonde, 1834 died in Schaerbeek, 1896) portrait and genre painter
Charles Verlat (born in Antwerp, 1824 died in Antwerp, 1890) painter and etcher

W

Baron Gustaf Wappers (born in Antwerp, 1803 died in Paris, France, 1874) Romanticism
Camille Wauters (born in Temse, 1856 died in Lokeren, 1919) Landscape painting
Charles Augustin Wauters (born in Boom, 1808 died in Mechelen, 1869) Religious subjects and genre scenes
Emile Wauters (1846–1933) history painter and portraitist
Ernest Welvaert (born in Lokeren, 1880 died in Uccle, 1946)
Antoine Joseph Wiertz (born in Dinant, 1806 died in Brussels, 1865) Romanticism
Florent Joseph Marie Willems (1823–1905) genre painter
Roger Wittevrongel (born in Blankenberge, 1933) Contemporary
Rik Wouters (1882–1916) Fauvism
Cindy Wright (born 1972)
Juliette Wytsman (1866–1925)
Rodolphe Wytsman (1860–1927)
Peter Weidenbaum (born in Antwerp, 1968)- Contemporary

See also

 Belgian art
 List of Belgians

References

Painters
Belgian